Rudolf Schiffl (18 August 1941 – 8 March 2013) was a German archer. He competed in the men's individual event at the 1976 Summer Olympics.

References

External links
 

1941 births
2013 deaths
German male archers
Olympic archers of West Germany
Archers at the 1976 Summer Olympics
People from Dachau
Sportspeople from Upper Bavaria